Kastritsi may refer to:

Ano Kastritsi, a village in Achaea, Greece
Kato Kastritsi, a village in Achaea, Greece
Charikleia Kastritsi (born 1983), Greek female weightlifter who competed in the 2004 Summer Olympics

See also
Kastritsa, a village in Epirus, Greece